Rated Next is the debut studio album by American musical group Next. After forming, the trio recorded several songs with record producers Prof. T. and Lance Alexander before catching recording artist and producer Keir "KayGee" Gist of  American hip hop trio Naughty by Nature's attention. He signed Next to his record label Divine Mill, with most of Next's debut album being recorded in Gee's in-home recording studio and the remaining was recorded at Ken Johnston's Perfect Pair studio located in East Orange, New Jersey. Rated Next was eventually released on September 30, 1997 in the United States, under Divine Mill and Arista Records.

Upon its release, Rated Next received generally favorable reviews from music critics, though it received negative criticism for the sexual innuendo within the lyrics. The album peaked at number 37 on the Billboard 200 and was certified two times platinum by the Recording Industry Association of America (RIAA). The album spawned three singles: "Butta Love", "Too Close" and "I Still Love You". "Too Close" topped the Billboard Hot 100 and was certified platinum by the RIAA. "Butta Love" and "I Still Love You" peaked within the top 20 on the Billboard Hot 100 and were both certified gold by the RIAA.  "Butta Love" was produced by Lance Alexander of the group Lo-Key.

Conception and recording
Next was formed in 1992 by brothers Terrence "T-Low" and Raphael "Tweety" Brown, in addition to Robert "R. L." Huggar. The trio was trained and managed by T-Low's godmother, Ann Nesby, during the group's formation. While performing in Minneapolis, Minnesota, Next collaborated with record producers Prof. T. and Lance Alexander. They began recording music in the Flyte Tyme recording studio. A demo that the trio recorded caught the attention of recording artist and producer Kay Gee of Naughty by Nature. He called Next three days later and signed the group to his Divine Mill record label. Managed by the Flavor Unit, Rated Next was recorded in Gee's in-home recording studio. The trio recorded several songs during this time, including "Phone Sex" and "Sexitude". During a "growth period", Next recorded "Butta Love", in which group member Tweety described as "the difference in the freedom we were feeling".

Marketing promotion
Next released the album's lead single, "Butta Love", in August 1997. According to Arista Records senior vice president of black music Lionel Ridenour, the success of the single "kept growing to the point where we had worked it from July through December". In order to give the group exposure, Arista promoted Next by having them speak in several radio stations and perform on television programs. The album's second single, "Too Close", topped the Billboard Hot 100 and was certified platinum by the RIAA, going on to sell 2.1 million copies. "Butta Love" and "I Still Love You" peaked in the top 20 of the Hot 100 and were certified gold by the RIAA. The two singles sold 900,000 and 700,000 copies, respectively.

Singles
 
"Butta Love" was the lead single and was released August 19, 1997. The song charted on the US Billboard Hot 100 at 16 and on the US R&B/Hip-Hop at 4. The second single was "Too Close"; it was released on January 27, 1998. The song charted at 1 on the US Billboard Hot 100 and on the US R&B/Hip-Hop. The final single was "I Still Love You"; it was released July 21, 1998. The song charted on the US Billboard Hot 100 at 14 and on the US R&B/Hip-Hop at 4

Reception

Rated Next received generally favorable reviews from music critics. Leo Stanley of Allmusic described the album as "an impressive collection of contemporary hip-hop-influenced urban soul". He felt that the group "may get a little too 'risqué' for some tastes", but stated that the lead singer R. L., was "so smooth and charismatic that he can seduce unwilling listeners". Melanie Mcfarland of The Seattle Times noted that the group "swings between party anthems and tender ballads with a sexy flow" on the album. The album received negative criticism due to the sexual innuendo in the lyrics of the songs. Tweety noted that one review wrote: "Even if Next never made it as singers, they could still make it as exotic dancers." Robert Christgau called the album a collection of "cute pop songs about... their erections and her clitoris".

Track listing

Personnel
As credits listed on AllMusic.

 Lance Alexander – producer, engineer
 Michael Benabib – photography
 Eddie Berkeley – producer
 Marcus Blassingame – stylist
 Coffey Brown – vocals, background vocals
 Mike Campbell – guitar
 Ian Dalsemer – assistant engineer
 Clive Davis – executive producer
 Chris Gehringer – mastering
 Deedee Gist – associate producer
 Sheldon Goode – producer, engineer
 Anthony Harrison, Jr. – art direction
 Carlton Hitchcock – engineer
 Wesley Hodges – producer
 Adina Howard – performer
 Ken Johnston – engineer
 Kay Gee – producer, engineer, executive producer, mixing

 Lamar Kronick – vocoder
 Cliff Lighty – producer
 Darren Lighty – producer, engineer
 Mike T. – mixing
 Mr. Walt – producer
 Mufi – producer
 Next – background vocals
 Kevin Pierce – guitar
 Angela Piva – engineer, mixing
 Prof. T. – background vocals, producer, engineer
 Frank Reynolds – producer
 Andy Salas – mixing assistant
 Vernell Sales – background vocals
 Duganz Shaloni – rap
 Steve Sola – mixing assistant
 Kieran Walsh – mixing
 Charm Warren – associate producer

Charts

Weekly charts

Year-end charts

Certifications

References

External links
 
 

1997 debut albums
Next (American band) albums